= Hilario Ramos =

American politician

Hilario "Charlie" Ramos
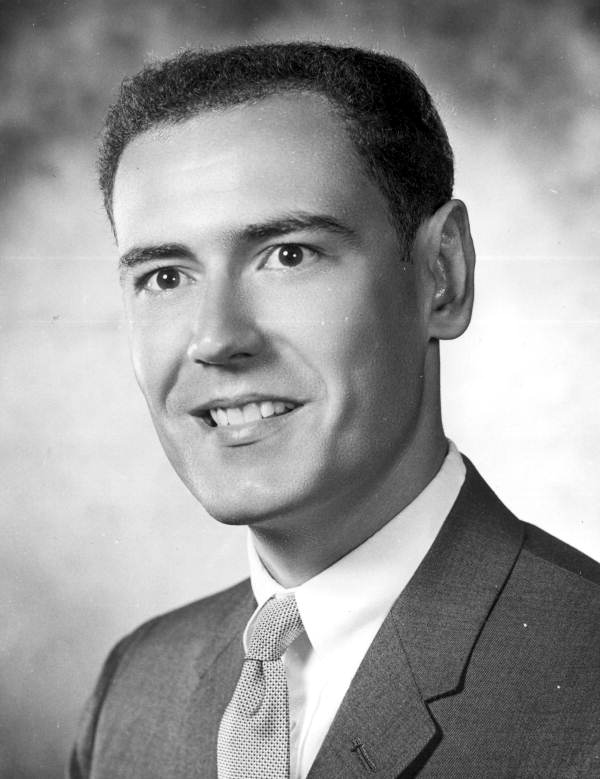

Member of the Florida House of Representatives from the Monroe County district
- In office 1961–1964

Personal details
- Born: December 17, 1936 Key West, Florida, U.S.
- Died: April 29, 2007 (aged 70)
- Party: Democratic
- Education: University of Miami
- Occupation: wholesale liquor dealer, real estate developer

Hilario "Charlie" Ramos Jr. (December 17, 1936 – April 29, 2007) was a politician in the American state of Florida. He served in the Florida House of Representatives from 1962 to 1964, representing Monroe County.
